Necrotizing periodontal diseases is one of the seven categories of periodontitis as defined by the American Academy of Periodontology 1999 classification system and is one of the three classifications of periodontal diseases and conditions within the 2017 classification.

Necrotizing periodontal diseases are a type of inflammatory periodontal (gum) disease caused by bacteria (notably fusobacteria and spirochaete species). The diseases appear to represent different severities or stages of the same disease process, although this is not completely certain. These diseases usually have a sudden onset, and so the term acute is often added to the diagnosis. The mildest on the spectrum is necrotizing ulcerative gingivitis (NUG), followed by the successively more severe conditions necrotizing ulcerative periodontitis (NUP), necrotizing stomatitis and finally cancrum oris (noma), which is frequently fatal.

Necrotizing ulcerative gingivitis

Necrotizing ulcerative gingivitis, (NUG), or simply necrotizing gingivitis (NG), is a common, non-contagious infection of the gums. Acute necrotizing ulcerative gingivitis (ANUG) is the acute presentation of NUG, which is the usual course the disease takes. If improperly treated NUG may become chronic and/or recurrent. In developed countries, ANUG occurs mostly in young adults with predisposing factors such as psychological stress, sleep deprivation, poor oral hygiene, smoking, immunosuppression and/or malnutrition. In developing countries, ANUG occurs mostly in malnourished children. Due to shared predisposing factors in a population (e.g. students during a period of examinations, armed forces recruits) ANUG is known to occur in epidemic-type patterns. This has led to the popular belief that ANUG is contagious, but this is not the case. The main features of NUG are painful, bleeding gums and ulceration and necrosis of the interdental papilla. There may also be intra-oral halitosis, cervical lymphadenitis (swollen lymph nodes in the neck) and malaise. Treatment of the acute disease is by debridement and antibiotics, usually metronidazole. Poor oral hygiene and other predisposing factors may need to be corrected to prevent recurrence. ANUG is also known as trench mouth, as it was observed to occur in the mouths of front line soldiers during World War I.

Necrotizing ulcerative periodontitis
Necrotizing ulcerative periodontitis (NUP, or simply necrotizing periodontitis, NP) or acute necrotizing ulcerative periodontitis (ANUP) is where the infection leads to attachment loss (destruction of the ligaments anchoring teeth in their sockets), but involves only the gingiva, periodontal ligament and alveolar ligament. Usually this spectrum of diseases result in loss of attachment, and therefore many ANUG diagnoses may be technically termed NUP, although ANUG is the term in most common use. NUP may be an extension of NUG into the periodontal ligaments, although this is not completely proven. In the meantime, NUG and NUP are classified together under the term necrotizing periodontal diseases.

Necrotizing stomatitis
Progression of NUP into tissue beyond the mucogingival junction characterizes necrotizing stomatitis, which has many features in similar with cancrum oris.

Cancrum oris

Cancrum oris (also termed noma) is a necrotizing and destructive infection of the mouth and face, and therefore not strictly speaking a periodontal disease. In modern times, this condition usually occurs in malnourished children in developing countries. It may be disfiguring and is frequently fatal. It has been suggested that all cases of cancrum oris develop from pre-existing NUG, but this is not confirmed. Furthermore, the vast majority of cases of NUG and NUP will not progress to the more severe forms, even without treatment.

Vincent's angina

Strictly speaking, Vincent's angina is not a necrotizing periodontal disease. However, Vincent's angina is widely confused with necrotizing ulcerative gingivitis (previously also called "Vincent's gingivitis"). Vincent's angina is tonsillitis and pharyngitis, and does not typically involve the gums. Many publications using the term "Vincent's angina" date from the twentieth century, and the term is not so common in modern times. The condition is named after Jean Hyacinthe Vincent, a French physician who was working at the Paris Pasteur Institute. Vincent described a fusospirochetal infection of the pharynx and palatine tonsils, causing "ulcero-membranous pharyngitis and tonsillitis", which later became known as Vincent's angina. Later in 1904, Vincent described the same pathogenic organisms in "ulceronecrotic gingivitis".

References

 J Lindhe, NP Lang, T Karring (editors) (2008) "Clinical periodontology and implant dentistry" 5th edition, Blackwell Munksgaard, pp. 413,459
 MG Newman, HH. Takei, PR Klokkevold, FA Carranza (editors) (2012) "Carranza's clinical periodontology" 11th edition, Elsevier/Saunders, p. 165

Periodontology
Periodontal disorders